Ramesh Krishnan defeated Amos Mansdorf 6–4, 6–0 to win the 1989 Heineken Open singles competition. Mansdorf was the defending champion.

Seeds
A champion seed is indicated in bold text while text in italics indicates the round in which that seed was eliminated.

  Amos Mansdorf (final)
  Ramesh Krishnan (champion)
  Milan Šrejber (second round)
  Michiel Schapers (first round)
  Richard Matuszewski (first round)
  Horacio de la Peña (second round)
  Shuzo Matsuoka (first round)
  Jim Grabb (quarterfinals)

Draw

Key
 Q – Qualifier
 WC –Wild card
 LL – l=Lucky loser

External links
 ATP Men's Singles draw

Singles
ATP Auckland Open